Stefano Marcia (born November 23, 1993) is a South African sailor. He competed at the 2016 Summer Olympics in the men's Laser event, in which he placed 40th.

References

1993 births
Living people
South African male sailors (sport)
Olympic sailors of South Africa
Sailors at the 2016 Summer Olympics – Laser